Castulo is a genus of moths in the subfamily Arctiinae erected by Francis Walker in 1854. The genus consists of two species, both found in Australia.

Species 
 Castulo doubledayi
 Castulo plagiata

References

External links 

Lithosiini
Moth genera